Sredneuralsk is a town under the administrative jurisdiction of the Town of Verkhnyaya Pyshma in Sverdlovsk Oblast, Russia, located on the shore of Iset Lake, at the head of the Iset River,  north of Yekaterinburg. Population:  19,555 (2002 Census);

History
It was founded in on June 27, 1931. Town status was granted to it on February 17, 1966.

Administrative and municipal status
Within the framework of the administrative divisions, it is, together with twenty-seven rural localities, subordinated to the Town of Verkhnyaya Pyshma—an administrative unit with the status equal to that of the districts. As a municipal division, Sredneuralsk, together with three rural localities, is incorporated as Sredneuralsk Urban Okrug. The town of Verkhnyaya Pyshma and twenty-four rural localities are incorporated separately as Verkhnyaya Pyshma Urban Okrug.

Climate
The climate of Sredneyralsk is continental. The snow cover usually stays on surface for up to five months from November to the middle of April.

The main rock soil components are granite and argillaceous slates.

Economy
Thermal power station "SUGRES" is based in Sredneuralsk. The station was officially opened on June 27, 1931.  Other industrial enterprises include:
Sredneuralsk Metallurgical Plant (est. 1941)
Sredneuralsk Concrete Product Plant (est. 1964)
Sredneuralsk Housing Construction Company (est. 1966)
Sredneuralsk Railway Transport Enterprise (est. 1975)
Wine Factory (est. 1960)
Poultry Plant (est. 1973)

Transportation
The town is connected to the main bus route.

Education and culture
There are three secondary and primary schools, one kindergarten, and a campus of the Ural Metallurgical College in Sredneuralsk.

There is also Volna movie theater and a library of 70,000 books.

Tourism
There are about thirty architecture points of interest in Sredneuralsk, such as Chortovo Gorodishche, Sem Bratyev (Seven Brothers), etc.

References

Notes

Sources

Cities and towns in Sverdlovsk Oblast
Cities and towns built in the Soviet Union
Populated places established in 1931